Nuno Claro Simões Coimbra (born 7 January 1977), known as Claro, is a Portuguese former professional footballer who played as a goalkeeper.

Club career
Claro was born in Tondela, Viseu District. During his Portuguese career he played almost always in the lower leagues (Segunda Liga or lower), starting out at local club Académico de Viseu FC. His Primeira Liga input consisted of 13 games with Moreirense F.C. from 2003 to 2005, and in January 2007 he signed with F.C. Paços de Ferreira from lowly S.L. Nelas, but could only be third choice, being released after a few months.

Claro transferred to CFR Cluj of Romania in June 2007, joining a host of compatriots and winning the Liga I title in his debut season, contributing 15 matches. From 2009 to 2011 he made the bulk of his appearances (48), winning another national championship in the former campaign; he was released in June 2013 at the age of 36, but continued to compete in the country, first with ACS Poli Timișoara.

Honours
Paços de Ferreira
Segunda Liga: 1999–2000

Cluj
Liga I: 2007–08, 2009–10, 2011–12
Cupa României: 2007–08, 2008–09, 2009–10
Supercupa României: 2009, 2010

References

External links

1977 births
Living people
Sportspeople from Viseu District
Portuguese footballers
Association football goalkeepers
Primeira Liga players
Liga Portugal 2 players
Segunda Divisão players
Académico de Viseu F.C. players
AD Fafe players
F.C. Paços de Ferreira players
C.D. Trofense players
Gondomar S.C. players
Moreirense F.C. players
Liga I players
Liga II players
CFR Cluj players
ACS Poli Timișoara players
CSM Slatina footballers
Portuguese expatriate footballers
Expatriate footballers in Romania
Portuguese expatriate sportspeople in Romania